Cataetyx is a genus of viviparous brotulas.

Species
There are currently 12 recognized species in this genus:
 Cataetyx alleni (Byrne, 1906)
 Cataetyx bruuni (J. G. Nielsen & Nybelin, 1963)
 Cataetyx chthamalorhynchus Cohen, 1981
 Cataetyx hawaiiensis Gosline, 1954
 Cataetyx laticeps Koefoed, 1927
 Cataetyx lepidogenys (H. M. Smith & Radcliffe, 1913)
 Cataetyx messieri (Günther, 1878) (Hair-lip brotula) 
 Cataetyx nielseni Balushkin & Prokofiev, 2005 (Nielsen's catetyx)
 Cataetyx niki Cohen, 1981 (Brown brotula)
 Cataetyx platyrhynchus Machida, 1984
 Cataetyx rubrirostris C. H. Gilbert, 1890 (Rubynose brotula)
 Cataetyx simus Garman, 1899

References

Bythitidae
Taxa named by Albert Günther